Pentapeltis is a genus of flowering plants belonging to the family Apiaceae.

Its native range is Southwestern Australia.

Species
Species:

Pentapeltis peltigera 
Pentapeltis silvatica

References

Mackinlayoideae
Apiaceae genera
Taxa named by Alexander von Bunge